is the second studio album by Chara, which was released on September 1, 1992. It debuted at #14 on the Japanese Oricon album charts, and charted in the top 200 for seven weeks. It eventually sold 65,000 copies.

It was preceded by the single debut single  in July. A re-cut single, was released two months after the album's release date. It featured rock musician Rolly Teranishi in background vocals. Neither of these singles charted in the Oricon top 100 singles.

In December 1992, Soul Kiss received a Japan Record Award for best rock/pop album from a new artist. In October 1993, the album was awarded the first Ryoichi Hattori Music Festival Album of Excellence Award, created in memory of Hattori, who died in January of that year.

Track listing

Japan Sales Rankings

References
 	

Chara (singer) albums
1992 albums